Balioxena is a genus of moths belonging to the subfamily Tortricinae of the family Tortricidae. The genus was erected by  Edward Meyrick.

Species
Balioxena iospila Meyrick, 1912

See also
List of Tortricidae genera

References

 , 1912, Exotic Microlepid. 1: 12.
 , 2005, World Catalogue of Insects 5

External links
tortricidae.com

Archipini
Tortricidae genera
Taxa named by Edward Meyrick